The Dhansiri–Zubza Line is a single-track railroad under construction between the two major cities of the Indian state of Nagaland—Dimapur and Kohima. The line starts from Dhansiri junction near Dimapur Railway Station to Kohima Zubza Railway Station. It is a part of Northeast Frontier Railway zone of Indian Railways.

History 
The Dimapur Railway Station was first opened in 1903. As part of the Indian Railway's ambitious plan to connect all the capitals of the north-eastern states by broad gauge rail link, railway minister Suresh Prabhu laid the foundation stone of the 88-km rail line to bring Kohima, the capital of Nagaland, on the railway map of India. The project will be executed in three phases.
 The first phase involves the construction of Dhansiri to Shokhuvi (16  km) line.
 The second phase involves Shokhuvi to Khaibung. (30  km)
 The third phase involves Khaibung to Zubza. (45  km)

First announced in 2006, the line is currently expected to open in March 2026.

Stations

Current status
As of August 2019, the 25% work on the 82.5 km line from Dimapur to Zubza near Kohima has been completed, railway has requested the Nagaland Government to expedite the land acquisition process which is holding up progress on this rail link.

References

Northeast Frontier Railway zone
Rail transport in Nagaland